Harries v The Church Commissioners for England [1992] 1 WLR 1241 is an English trusts law case, concerning the possibility to invest ethically. It tempers the decision in Cowan v Scargill to show that trustees can make investments, guided by ethical considerations, if it can be shown that overall financial performance would not be harmed, but also if it would be consistent with the purpose of the trust.

Facts
Richard Harries, Bishop of Oxford, challenged the Commissioners to change their investment policy. 85% of the fund provided income for stipends for serving clergy, pensions for retired clergy and housing for both. Harries argued that investments should not be selected that were incompatible with ‘the promotion of the Christian faith through the Church of England’ even if it involved financial detriment. The Commissioners argued their policy was fine, of regarding non-financial considerations so far as it did not ‘significantly jeopardise or interfere with accepted investment principles’. The Commissioners already excluded 13% of companies under its existing investment policy, and evidence showed that a more restrictive policy of not investing in South Africa meant not investing in a further 24% of listed companies (to reach 37% in total).

Judgment
Sir Donald Nicholls, V.-C. held that the Commissioners policy was sound. He went on to say that one can invest ethically if otherwise there would be a conflict with the trust’s objects.

See also

Buttle v Saunders [1950] 2 All ER 193
Cowan v Scargill [1985] Ch 270
Liverpool and District Hospital for Diseases of the Heart v Attorney General [1981] 1 All ER 994

References
JH Langbein and RA Posner, ‘Social Investing and the Law of Trusts’ (1980–1981) 79 Michigan Law Review 72, 88
Donald Nicholls, ‘Trustees and their broader community: where duty, morality and ethics converge’ (1995) 9(3) Trusts Law International 71

English trusts case law
1991 in case law
1991 in British law
High Court of Justice cases
History of the Church of England